The Islamic City Council of Tabriz is the elected council that presides over the city of Tabriz, elects the Mayor of Tabriz, and budgets of the Municipality of Tabriz. The council is composed of twenty-one members elected from single-member districts for four-year terms. The Chairman and the Deputy Chairman of the Council are chosen by the council at the first regular meeting in odd-numbered years. In the last election between Principlists and reformers, Principlists won the most seats.

Members

Current members (2021- continues) 
Chairman of Council: Rasoul Barghi

5th term (2017–2021) 
Chairman of Council: Shahram Dabiri

4th term (2013–2017) 
Officers:
Chairman of Council: Shahram Dabiri

References

Notes

 Were ousted because of corruption

 Were replaced alternate members

External links
 Islamic City Council of Tabriz, the council's website (in Persian)

Government of Tabriz
Buildings and structures in Tabriz
Tabriz
1999 establishments in Iran